The United Kingdom Census 1911 of 2 April 1911 was the 12th nationwide census conducted in the United Kingdom of Great Britain and Ireland. The total population of the United Kingdom was approximately 45,221,000, with 36,070,000 recorded in England and Wales, 4,761,000 in Scotland, and 4,390,000 in Ireland.

Geographical scope
The census covered England, Wales, Scotland, the Channel Islands, and ships of the Royal Navy at sea and in ports abroad.

The Census of Ireland, 1911 was carried out on the same day but the records are held separately by the National Archives of Ireland.

Questions
The 1911 census was the first to ask about nationality, the duration of current marriage, number of children born within that marriage, number of living children and the number of any children who had died. It was the first to record full details of British Army personnel stationed overseas instead of requiring just a simple headcount. 

This census was subject to protests by women seeking the right to vote in the UK,
with some suffragettes like Joan Cather refusing to fill in the forms, which were returned with sloganned stickers. Her husband supported her position as he annotated the Census form that he had 'conscientious scruples' as head of household to note any 'female occupants' to avoid the census statistics being used by legislators for 'further vexatious legislation' against women 'in which they have no voice'. He went on to say he would provide the information if the Conciliation Committee Bill passed into law. The Registrar did however note two females as 'the probable number'. Emily Davison hid herself in a cupboard at the Palace of Westminster, becoming, when found, listed on the form as an occupant of the building.

It was also the first census where the forms were completed by the respondents and retained rather than being copied into the enumeration books.

The census forms (schedules) contained an address and schedule number and were divided into sixteen columns:

 Name and Surname.
 Relationship to Head of Family.
 Age (Males).
 Age (Females).
 Marital condition.
 Number of years married (present marriage) - Married women only.
 Children born to present marriage.
 Children still living.
 Children who have died.
 Occupation.
 Industry or service with which worker is connected.
 Employment status.
 Whether working at home.
 Birthplace.
 Nationality - if born in a Foreign Country.
 Infirmity.

Schedules were also prepared for:

Institutions (workhouses, hospitals, hotels, schools, etc.).
Shipping (merchant vessels).
Military establishments (barracks, training schools, British Army overseas, etc.).
Royal Naval vessels (in home ports).

Online access
The census data was published online on a subscription basis in 2009.

See also
Census in the United Kingdom
List of United Kingdom censuses

References

1911
Census
United Kingdom
United Kingdom